Siraba Dembélé Pavlović (born 28 June 1986) is a French professional handballer who plays as a left wing for CSM București and is a retired captain for the French national team.

International honours
EHF Cup:
Winner: 2017
EHF Challenge Cup:
Finalist: 2008
World Championship:
Winner: 2017
Silver Medalist: 2009, 2011
European Championship:
Winner: 2018
Bronze Medalist: 2006, 2016
Olympic Games:
Silver Medalist: 2016

Individual awards
All-Star Left Wing of the EHF Champions League: 2015, 2018 
All-Star Left Wing of the Championnat de France: 2008, 2009, 2010, 2011, 2012
Championnat de France MVP: 2011

Personal life
In November 2019, she gave birth to twins. Her husband is the Serbian footballer Igor Pavlović.

References

External links

 

1986 births
Living people
Sportspeople from Dreux
French sportspeople of Malian descent
French female handball players
Expatriate handball players
French expatriate sportspeople in Denmark
French expatriate sportspeople in North Macedonia
French expatriate sportspeople in Russia
French expatriate sportspeople in Romania
Olympic handball players of France
Olympic medalists in handball
Olympic silver medalists for France
Handball players at the 2012 Summer Olympics
Handball players at the 2016 Summer Olympics
Medalists at the 2016 Summer Olympics
European champions for France
Sports world champions
Black French sportspeople
Mediterranean Games medalists in handball
Mediterranean Games gold medalists for France
Competitors at the 2009 Mediterranean Games